Gary Lewis (born Gary Harold Lee Levitch; July 31, 1945) is an American musician who was the leader of Gary Lewis & the Playboys.

Early life
Gary Lewis is the son of Jerry Lewis and singer Patti Palmer. His mother, who was performing at the time with the Ted Fio Rito Orchestra, intended to name him after her favorite actor, Cary Grant, but her son became "Gary" as the result of a clerical error. He received a set of drums as a gift for his 15th birthday in 1960. When he was 18, Lewis formed the band "Gary and the Playboys" with four friends. Joking at the lateness of bandmates to practice, Lewis referred to them as "playboys", and the name stuck.

Lewis was the drummer, and Dave Walker was the singer and guitarist. Gary's mother was quietly funding the purchases of equipment as they believed Gary's father would not support the band financially.  Without the Lewis cachet, the band was relatively anonymous. Even though he lived down the street from the Lewis family, producer Snuff Garrett was not aware of the band until a mutual friend, conductor Les Brown, informed him that the group was appearing at Disneyland and that Garrett should give them a listen.

Lewis was drafted into the United States Army. During his two years of service, he spent two months at the Saigon Airport during the Vietnam War, and the remainder of the time in South Korea.

Gary Lewis & the Playboys

Seeing an opportunity to capitalize on the Lewis name,  Garrett put the band into the studio to develop, still financed by Gary's mother.  Garrett pushed Lewis to improve his drumming skill, even getting Buddy Rich to tutor him, and, more importantly, made Lewis the singer, and therefore the focal point of the group.  By Lewis' own admission, his natural singing voice was not one of his strengths, and Garrett employed overdubbing techniques in the studio to enhance it. "This Diamond Ring" hit number one on the Billboard Hot 100 on February 20, 1965, making Lewis an instant star. Lewis was Cash Box magazine's 1965 "Male Vocalist of the Year". Besides The Lovin' Spoonful, the group was the only act during the 1960s to have its first seven Hot 100 releases each reach that chart's top 10.

In addition to "This Diamond Ring", his hits include "Count Me In," the only non-British Commonwealth record in the Hot 100's top 10 on May 8, 1965, (number two); "Save Your Heart for Me" (number two); "Everybody Loves a Clown" (number four); "She's Just My Style" (number three); "Sure Gonna Miss Her" (number nine); and "Green Grass" (number eight). Of "Everybody Loves a Clown", Lewis says he composed the song as a gift for his father's birthday. He believed the song was too good, so instead of giving it as a gift, he recorded it. By 1966, Lewis was exclusively singing, replaced on the drums by, among others, Jim Keltner. His career was put on hold when he entered the U.S. Army as a draftee in January 1967, and he served during the Vietnam War era with the Eighth Army in Seoul, South Korea, until 1968. Lewis released a solo album in 1967 for Liberty Records called Listen!.

Lewis has stated that he was reluctant to go to Vietnam, but he credits the Army with being the time when he "grew up". He returned to performing and recording, but did not recapture his earlier success and five releases by the band that year peaked from 13th to 39th. His musical career was later marketed as a "nostalgia act" with appearances on his father's Labor Day telethons for the Muscular Dystrophy Association, including the 2010 telethon which was his dad's final as host. In January 2012, Lewis released a new single, "You Can't Go Back".

Film appearances
He appeared uncredited in his father's movie The Nutty Professor (1963). He also appeared in a credited role singing "The Land of La-la-la" with his dad in Rock-A-Bye Baby (1958), where he played Jerry Lewis as a boy. He also was seen in the movie The Family Jewels (1965).

Later life
In 1971, Lewis took a break from performing, operating a music shop in the San Fernando Valley and giving drumming lessons.  A brief attempt at starting a new band called Medecine, with Billy Cowsill of the Cowsills in 1974, was not successful. Lewis began touring again in the 1980s, with various incarnations of the Playboys, generally featuring no other original members. On the nationally syndicated program Inside Edition, Gary met his half-sister Suzan Klienman, who had learned from DNA testing results that they are related siblings, the children of comedy star Jerry Lewis. Lewis and his family reside in Rush, New York.

In the summer of 2013, Lewis, along with a group of 1960s musicians including Gary Puckett (Gary Puckett & The Union Gap), Chuck Negron (formerly of Three Dog Night), Mark Lindsay (former lead singer of Paul Revere & the Raiders), and The Turtles featuring Flo & Eddie, toured 47 cities in Paradise Artist's "Happy Together" tour. As of 2022, Gary Lewis and the Playboys are still touring the world on their own and occasionally with other popular acts of the 1950s, '60s, and '70s. The group performs on cruise ships, at casinos, festivals, fairs, and corporate events.

References

External links

1945 births
Living people
Musicians from Los Angeles
Musicians from Newark, New Jersey
Military personnel from California
Military personnel from Newark, New Jersey
United States Army personnel of the Vietnam War
American people of Russian-Jewish descent
American people of Italian descent
American rock singers
20th-century American drummers
American male drummers
United States Army soldiers
20th-century American male singers
20th-century American singers
Jerry Lewis